South Cambridgeshire is a constituency represented in the House of Commons of the UK Parliament since 2019 by Anthony Browne, a Conservative.

Constituency profile 
The constituency includes some outskirts of Cambridge such as Girton and its eponymous Cambridge College, and a large spread of rural land to the west of the city, which is generally affluent.  The population live in villages, most of which are compact – the most densely populated are in the south where two railway lines and the M11 motorway provide rapid access to London. The seat's only ward (Queen Edith's) that lies within the City of Cambridge has a strong Liberal Democrat vote. This ward also contains the Cambridge College Homerton and Addenbrooke's Hospital.

Registered jobseekers totalled 1.4% of the population, much lower than the regional average of 3.1% and the national average of 3.8% of the population in a statistical compilation by The Guardian in November 2012. In 2017 South Cambridgeshire was identified as the constituency with the lowest proportion of claimants of unemployment benefits in the whole of the country, with only 0.6% of the economically active population claiming either Job Seekers Allowance or Universal Credit.

Boundaries and boundary changes 

1997–2010: The District of South Cambridgeshire wards of Arrington, Bar Hill, Barrington and Shepreth, Barton, Bassingbourn, Bourn, Comberton, Coton, Duxford, Elsworth, Foxton, Gamlingay, Girton, Great Shelford, Hardwick, Harston, Haslingfield, Ickleton, Little Shelford, Longstanton, Melbourn, Meldreth, Orwell, Papworth, Sawston, Stapleford, Swavesey, The Mordens, and Whittlesford; and the City of Cambridge wards of Queen Edith's and Trumpington.

2010–present: The District of South Cambridgeshire wards of Bar Hill, Barton, Bassingbourn, Bourn, Caldecote, Comberton, Cottenham, Duxford, Fowlmere and Foxton, Gamlingay, Girton, Grantchester, Hardwick, Harston and Hauxton, Haslingfield and The Eversdens, Longstanton, Melbourn, Meldreth, Orwell and Barrington, Papworth and Elsworth, Sawston, Swavesey, The Abingtons, The Mordens, The Shelfords and Stapleford, and Whittlesford; and the City of Cambridge ward of Queen Edith's.

The constituency was created following the boundary review of 1995, and was first contested at the 1997 general election. Before this, much of the region had been part of the South West Cambridgeshire constituency represented by Sir Anthony Grant from 1983 to 1997, while the wards of Bar Hill, Coton, Elsworth, Girton, Longstanton and Swavesey had been part of South East Cambridgeshire.

Following the 2007 review of parliamentary representation in Cambridgeshire, the Boundary Commission made minor alterations to the existing constituencies to deal with population changes.

Trumpington ward and parts of Coleridge and Cherry Hinton wards in the City of Cambridge were transferred to Cambridge, having previously been part of South Cambridgeshire.

Additionally, parts of Cottenham ward (specifically the civil parishes of Cottenham and Rampton) and the Abingtons (Babraham, Great Abington, Little Abington and Pampisford) have been added to South Cambridgeshire, having previously voted in the South East Cambridgeshire constituency.

Members of Parliament

Elections

Elections in the 2010s

Elections in the 2000s

Elections in the 1990s

See also 
 List of parliamentary constituencies in Cambridgeshire
 South Cambridgeshire (administrative district)

Notes

References

Parliamentary constituencies in Cambridgeshire
Constituencies of the Parliament of the United Kingdom established in 1997
Cambourne